John Creighton, 1st Earl Erne PC (1731 – 15 September 1828), known as The Lord Erne between 1772 and 1781 and as The Viscount Erne between 1781 and 1789, was an Irish peer and politician.

Erne was the eldest surviving son of Abraham Creighton, 1st Baron Erne and Elizabeth Rogerson, and succeeded his father as second Baron in 1772. Between 1761 and 1773, he represented Lifford in the Irish House of Commons. In 1781 he was created Viscount Erne, of Crom Castle  in the County of Fermanagh, and in 1789 he was further honoured when he was made Earl Erne, of Crom Castle in the County of Fermanagh. He sat from 1800 to 1828 as one of the 28 original Irish Representative peers in the British House of Lords.

Marriages, children and succession
Lord Erne married, firstly, Catherine Howard, daughter of the Right Reverend Robert Howard, in 1761. After her death in 1775 he married, secondly, Lady Mary Caroline Hervey, daughter of Frederick Augustus Hervey, 4th Earl of Bristol in 1776, although the couple later separated. He died in September 1828 and was succeeded in his titles by his eldest son Abraham, who had been declared insane since 1798. His daughter by his second wife, Elizabeth, married the 1st Baron Wharncliffe.

References

Sources
 Burke's Peerage and Baronetage, 2003, 107th edition
Kidd, Charles, Williamson, David (editors). Debrett's Peerage and Baronetage (1990 edition). New York: St Martin's Press, 1990.
  

1731 births
1828 deaths
Irish MPs 1761–1768
Irish MPs 1769–1776
Members of the Parliament of Ireland (pre-1801) for County Donegal constituencies
Irish representative peers
Members of the Privy Council of Ireland
Members of the Irish House of Lords
Earls Erne